The twenty thousand rial banknote is a denomination of Iranian currency that was issued in 2003, and was considered its largest denomination until 2007.

Design
The note had been redesigned thrice in 2005, 2009 and 2014. The front displays a portrait of Rouhollah Khomeini. The original portrait was large, and never seen on any other banknote. In 2005, it was replaced by a smaller, more refined version. The 2004 version back side that featured Naqsh-e Jahan Square, had been redesigned twice. The version published in 2009 showed the al-Aqsa Mosque, which was replaced by Aghazadeh Mansion in the 2014 series. According to Christian Funke, both changes carried political motivations.

Previous versions

References

Banknotes of Iran
Currencies introduced in 2003